Raghunandanpur is a census town in Pakur CD block in Pakur subdivision of Pakur district in the Indian state of Jharkhand.

Geography

Location

Overview
Rajmahal coalfield is shown in the map. The entire area is overwhelmingly rural with only small pockets of urbanisation.

Note: The full screen map is interesting. All places marked on the map are linked and you can easily move on to another page of your choice. Enlarge the map to see what else is there – one gets railway links, many more road links and so on.

Demographics
According to the 2011 Census of India, Raghunandanpur had a total population of 8,335, of which 4,248 (51%) were males and 4,087 (49%) were females. Population in the age range 0–6 years was 1,903. The total number of literate persons in Raghunandanpur was 3,312 (51.49% of the population over 6 years).

Infrastructure
According to the District Census Handbook 2011, Pakur, Raghunandanpur covered an area of 0.82 km2. Among the civic amenities, it had 8 km roads with open drains, the protected water supply involved hand pump, tubewell/ borewell, overhead tank. It had 737 domestic electric connections. Among the educational facilities it had 1 primary school, 1 middle school, other educational facilities at Pakur 3 km away. An important commodity it manufactured was bidi. It had the branch office of 1 nationalised bank.

References

Cities and towns in Pakur district